Manuel Franco da Costa de Oliveira Falcão  (10 November 1922 – 21 February 2012) was a Portuguese Prelate of the Roman Catholic Church.  

Manuel Franco da Costa de Oliveira Falcão was born in Lisbon, and was ordained a priest on 29 June 1951.  Falcão was appointed auxiliary archbishop to the Archdiocese of Lisbon on 6 December 1966, as well as titular bishop of Thelepte, and ordained bishop on 22 January 1967. Falcão was appointed bishop of the Diocese of Beja on 8 September 1980 and would remain in the post until his retirement on 25 January 1999.

See also
Diocese of Beja
Archdiocese of Lisbon

External links
Catholic-Hierarchy
 Beja Diocese (Portuguese)

20th-century Roman Catholic bishops in Portugal
21st-century Roman Catholic bishops in Portugal
20th-century Roman Catholic titular bishops
1922 births
2012 deaths